Gimme the Power is a 2012 Mexican documentary film by Olallo Rubio about the band Molotov.

Synopsis 
Olallo Rubio traces the history of the Mexican rock band Molotov and their wider significance to Mexican politics explaining how Mexican rock music has always had a rather ambiguous relationship with the Mexican government and society in general since the late 1950s, passing through the Avandaro Festival's La Onda hippie generation until modern times.

Cast 
 Sergio Arau
 Olallo Rubio
 Juan Villoro
 Fernanda Tapia
 Molotov: Tito Fuentes, Miky Huidobro, Paco Ayala, and Randy Ebright
 Luis de Llano Macedo
 Alex Lora
 Armando Molina S.

Production 
Rubio had wanted to do a rockumentary for a long time and was inspired to direct one after he saw the band perform in Spain in 2003.  He said that he hoped the film would inspire young people to be more critical of the government.

Release 
Gimme the Power was released in Mexico on June 1, 2012, timed to appear just before the general election.

Reception 
According to El Universal, the film was received well in Mexico.

References

External links 
 

2012 films
2012 documentary films
Mexican documentary films
Rockumentaries
2010s Mexican films